How Does That Grab You? is the second studio album by Nancy Sinatra, released on Reprise Records in 1966. Arranged and conducted by Billy Strange, the album was produced by Lee Hazlewood. It peaked at number 41 on the Billboard 200 chart. The single, "How Does That Grab You, Darlin'?", reached number 7 on the Billboard Hot 100 chart, as well as number 19 on the UK Singles Chart.

Track listing

Charts

References

External links
 
 

1966 albums
Nancy Sinatra albums
Albums arranged by Billy Strange
Albums conducted by Billy Strange
Albums produced by Lee Hazlewood
Reprise Records albums
Sundazed Records albums